Juan Adriel Ochoa Reyes (born April 6, 1987, in Sinaloa) is a Mexican footballer who played in the Primera División A for Club Universidad de Guadalajara.

Football career
Ochoa played his first Meistriliiga game on March 9, 2010, against Tulevik.

References

External links

Profile at Soccernet.ee

1987 births
Living people
Footballers from Sinaloa
Mexican expatriate footballers
Mexican footballers
Association football midfielders
Nõmme Kalju FC players
Meistriliiga players
Expatriate footballers in Estonia
Mexican expatriate sportspeople in Estonia